HMS H1 was a H-class submarine built by Canadian Vickers Co., Montreal for the British Royal Navy. She was laid down on 11 January 1915 and was commissioned on 26 May 1915. H1 crossed the Atlantic from St. John's, Newfoundland to Gibraltar escorted by the armed merchant cruiser . H1 was sold on 7 March 1921 in Malta.

Design

H1 was fitted with a  Hotchkiss quick-firing gun and four  torpedo tubes. Its torpedo tubes were fitted to the bow and the submarine was loaded with eight  torpedoes. It is a Holland 602 type submarine but was designed to meet Royal Navy specifications. Its complement was twenty-two crew members.

References 

 

 

British H-class submarines
Ships built in Quebec
1915 ships
World War I submarines of the United Kingdom
Royal Navy ship names